HMS Blake was a 74-gun third-rate ship of the line of the Royal Navy, launched on 23 August 1808 at Deptford and named in honour of Admiral Robert Blake.

On 26 September 1812, Blake and Franchise provided naval support to a land attack, at night, on Tarragona by troops under the command of General Joaquín Ibáñez Cuevas, Baron d'Eroles. The attack was successful, and resulted, inter alia, in the capture of several small vessels. The Spanish troops suffered three men killed and eight wounded; the British had no casualties whatsoever. Captain Edward Codrington, of Blake, wrote to Baron d'Eroles and to Admiral Sir Edward Pellew, Commander-in-Chief in the Mediterranean, that the officers and crew declined any prize money from the action, in favour of the Spanish troops, "in admiration of the valour and the discipline which they shewed upon the occasion."

Fate
From 1814 Blake served as a prison ship. In 1816 she was sold out of the navy.

Notes

References

Lavery, Brian (2003) The Ship of the Line - Volume 1: The development of the battlefleet 1650-1850. Conway Maritime Press. .

 

Courageux-class ships of the line
1808 ships
Ships built in Deptford